Heir of Sea and Fire is a fantasy novel by American writer Patricia A. McKillip and the second book of the Riddle Master trilogy. It was published in 1977.

Plot summary 
The focus shifts from the previous protagonist of Morgon of Hed to Raederle of An. Raederle, the titular heir of sea and fire, was promised by her father to the man who won a riddle game with a ghost. In the previous book, this was revealed to be Morgon. As the book opens, Morgon has been missing for a year; with Morgon presumed dead, his power over the land of Hed has passed on to his heir.

Raederle sets out for Erlenstar Mountain, which Morgon was trying to reach when he disappeared. Along the way, she is assisted by Lyra, the Morgul of Herun's heir, and by Morgon's sister. The first half of the book describes their journey north. Along the way, Raederle grows to understand her own significant powers as a descendant of both shapechangers and witches.  Her hidden ancestry makes her related to Morgon's enemies. Midway through the story, Reaerle discovers that Morgon is alive, while shapechangers and Ghisteslwchlohm, an ancient and traitorous wizard, pursue him.

Sensing a powerful force pursuing her, Raederle uses her abilities to confound it, thinking she is protecting Morgon; but discovers that the force she thought was Ghisteslwchlohm is Morgon himself, who had stolen much of Ghisteslwchlohm's power during his long captivity, while the helpless man he pursued was Deth, who had betrayed him. Confronted with this, and realizing how he appears, Morgon forsakes his revenge and allows Deth to escape.

External links 
 

1977 American novels
1977 fantasy novels
American fantasy novels
Fiction about shapeshifting
Novels by Patricia A. McKillip
Atheneum Books books